Martina Hingis and Jana Novotná were the defending champions but only Novotná competed that year with Manon Bollegraf.

Bollegraf and Novotná lost in the semifinals to Anna Kournikova and Larisa Savchenko.

Sabine Appelmans and Miriam Oremans won in the final 1–6, 6–3, 7–6(7–3) against Kournikova and Savchenko.

Seeds
Champion seeds are indicated in bold text while text in italics indicates the round in which those seeds were eliminated.

 Manon Bollegraf /  Jana Novotná (semifinals)
 Alexandra Fusai /  Nathalie Tauziat (semifinals)
 Anna Kournikova /  Larisa Savchenko (final)
 Sabine Appelmans /  Miriam Oremans (champions)

Draw

External links
 1998 Open Gaz de France Doubles Draw
 Main draw (WTA)

Open GDF Suez
1998 WTA Tour